K-573 Novosibirsk is a  nuclear-powered cruise missile submarine of the Russian Navy. It is the second boat of the project Yasen-M. Considerable changes were made to the initial Yasen design. Differences in the project have appeared sufficient to consider it as a new upgraded version Yasen-M. The submarine is named after the city of Novosibirsk.

Design 
The submarine project was developed in the Malachite Design Bureau in Saint Petersburg.

Compared to the first-of-class Severodvinsk, Kazan and Novosibirsk are some  shorter, resulting in the deletion of a sonar array from the former's bow. According to one naval analyst, the intention was likely to reduce construction costs without meaningfully reducing the submarine's capabilities. Novosibirsk will also include a nuclear reactor with a newly designed cooling system.

History 

On 21 August 2014, the vessel completed hydraulic pressure hull tests as part of its construction process.

On 25 December 2019, Novosibirsk was rolled out of the construction hall and subsequently launched on the water. It began its sea trials on 1 July 2021 and was projected to join the Pacific Fleet of the Russian Navy in 4th Quarter 2021.

On 21 December 2021, Novosibirsk was commissioned along with Knyaz Oleg into the Pacific Fleet. Russian President Vladimir Putin attended the ceremony via a video call.

On 19 September 2022, Novosibirsk and the submarine Omsk respectively launched P-800 Oniks (SS-N-26 Strobile) and P-700 Granit (SS-N-19 Shipwreck) cruise missiles against seaborne targets in the Chukchi Sea. On 29 September, the submarine arrived to Petropavlovsk-Kamchatsky.

References 

Yasen-class submarines
Ships built by Sevmash
2019 ships